Demon of the Himalayas is a 1935 German-Swiss co-production adventure film directed by Andrew Marton and starring Gustav Diessl, Erika Dannhoff, and Günter Oskar Dyhrenfurth.  It is part of the Mountain film genre which was popular during the era.

Location shooting was done during the 1934 International Himalayan Expedition and a number of the Expedition's participants appeared in the film. The film premiered in Zürich in March 1935. It received a mixed reception from critics. It was remade in Hollywood by Marton in 1952 as Storm Over Tibet.

Cast

References

Bibliography

External links

1935 films
German adventure films
Mountaineering films
1930s German-language films
Films directed by Andrew Marton
Films about Tibet
Films set in the Himalayas
Tibetan-language films
Tobis Film films
1935 adventure films
German black-and-white films
Swiss black-and-white films
1930s German films